James T. Kelley (1855–1929) was an American architect practicing in Boston, Massachusetts.

Life and career
James Templeton Kelley was born September 4, 1855, in Roxbury, Massachusetts to Thomas Kelley and Jane (Stinson) Kelley. Kelley worked for Sturgis & Brigham before opening his own office in 1886. In the 1890s he was joined by draftsman and later architect Harold S. Graves, who took over the practice when Kelley retired after World War I. Kelley was best known for his work in the Colonial Revival style, and was noted as active in its revival.

Kelley was a founding member of the Boston Architectural Club in 1889, and joined the American Institute of Architects in 1901.

Personal life
Kelley was first married in 1882 to Eleanor Hale Sweetser of Lynn, who died in 1922 while traveling abroad in France. In 1923 he remarried to Marion (Seaverns) Williams, as her second husband. They hade no children. For much of his life, Kelley lived and worked in a house at 57 Mount Vernon Street in Beacon Hill, which he bought from the estate of Charles Francis Adams. Circa 1911-13 he and his first wife built a second home, designed by himself, at 12 Tupelo Road in Swampscott.

Kelley died January 4, 1929, while traveling in Washington, DC.

Legacy
Several of Kelley's works have been listed on the United States National Register of Historic Places, and others contribute to listed historic districts.

The James Templeton Kelley Prize, awarded by the Boston Society of Architects to students in the Harvard Graduate School of Design, is named for Kelley. This was established in 1929 by his second wife, Marion Kelley, as a traveling fellowship.

Architectural works
 Brewster Memorial Hall, 86 S Main St, Wolfeboro, New Hampshire (1888–1890, NRHP 1983)
 House for Charles W. Porter, 40 Nahant St, Lynn, Massachusetts (1889)
 House for Elihu Thomson, 22 Monument Ave, Swampscott, Massachusetts (1889, NHL and NRHP 1976)
 Brewster Academy, 80 Academy Dr, Wolfeboro, New Hampshire (1890, burned)
 House for J. Arthur Beebe, 199 Commonwealth Ave, Boston, Massachusetts (1890–1891)
 Lynn Bank Block, 21-29 Exchange St, Lynn, Massachusetts (1891, NRHP 1982)
 House for Charles Lovejoy, 64 Broad St, Lynn, Massachusetts (1893, NRHP 1978)
 House for Henry R. Reed, 46 Water St, Marion, Massachusetts (1893, NRHP 2019)
 House for Edward laCroix, 243 Ocean St, Lynn, Massachusetts (1895)
 House for T. Dennie Thomson, 54 Abbot St, Andover, Massachusetts (1895–96)
 Chatsworth Hall, 252-254 Ocean St, Lynn, Massachusetts (1898)
 House for Seth M. Richards, 58 N Main St, Newport, New Hampshire (1898–1899, NRHP 1984)
 House for Loren G. duBois, 405 Commonwealth Ave, Boston, Massachusetts (1900–1901)
 Crowell Memorial Chapel, Rosedale Cemetery, 4 Rosedale Ave, Manchester, Massachusetts (1903)
 House for Albert Eisemann, 4 Monmouth St, Brookline, Massachusetts (1904)
 "Greatwood Farm" for Willard S. Martin, 123 Pitkin Rd, Plainfield, Vermont (1908, NRHP 1996)
 Peter Faneuil School (former), 60 Joy St, Boston, Massachusetts (1909–1910, NRHP 1994)
 House for Henry W. Keene, 10 Miles Rd, Hingham, Massachusetts (1909)
 Swampscott Public Library, 61 Burrill St, Swampscott, Massachusetts (1917)
 South Congregational Church parsonage, 20 Church St, Newport, New Hampshire (1918, NRHP 1989)

Gallery of architectural works

Notes

References

1855 births
1929 deaths
Architects from Boston